Darwinia oederoides is a species of flowering plant in the family Myrtaceae and is endemic to the south-west of Western Australia. It is a low, spreading shrub with linear leaves and clusters of pendent flowers surrounded by red and yellow bracts.

Description
Flowering occurs from October to January.

This species is similar in appearance to the endangered species Darwinia whicherensis.

Taxonomy
The species was first formally described in 1849 by Nikolai Turczaninow who gave it the name Genetyllis oederoides and published the description in Bulletin de la Société Impériale des Naturalistes de Moscou. In 1865, George Bentham changed the name to Darwinia oederoides in The Journal of the Linnean Society, Botany. The specific epithet (oederoides) means "Oedera-like".

Distribution and habitat
Darwinia oederoides is often found in wet depressions and along watercourses in the Esperance Plains, Jarrah Forest, Mallee, Swan Coastal Plain and Warren bioregions of Western Australia where it grows in sandy soils.

References

oederoides
Endemic flora of Western Australia
Myrtales of Australia
Rosids of Western Australia
Plants described in 1849
Taxa named by Nikolai Turczaninow